The 2003 Worcester City Council election took place on 1 May 2003 to elect members of Worcester City Council in Worcestershire, England. One third of the council was up for election and the Conservative Party gained overall control of the council from no overall control.

After the election, the composition of the council was:
Conservative 19
Labour 10
Independent 5
Liberal Democrat 2

Campaign
13 seats were contested in the election with 2 seats available in St Nicholas ward after a Labour councillor stood down. Labour defended 7 seats as against 5 for the Conservatives and 1 for the independents. Meanwhile, the decision of the British National Party to put up a candidate in Holy Trinity ward received attention in the press.

Worcester was a top Conservative target council in the 2003 local elections, with gains here seen as important signal for the parties performance at the next general election. The Conservatives had controlled the council as a minority administration since the 2000 election and were hoping to win a majority. They said Labour had been out of touch when they ran the council and had made poor decisions such as using green fields for transport schemes. However, Labour attacked the Conservatives for the council's budget, including a council tax rise of 9.5% and poor waste collection services; as well as the controversy over the closing and then rescue of Swan Theatre in Worcester.

The level of postal voting in the election was up on previous years with 5,000 postal voting forms being sent, compared to 3,000 in 2002.

Election result
The results saw the Conservatives win a majority on the council, after gaining 2 seats from Labour but losing 1 seat to the Liberal Democrats. This meant that Labour only held 10 seats which was the lowest number of seats they had held on the council up to then. However Labour did manage to retain Holy Trinity ward, defeating the British National Party who came second in the ward. Voter turnout was low, dropping as low as 18% in St Barnabus ward.

Ward results

References

2003
2003 English local elections
2000s in Worcestershire